Cuconeștii Noi is a commune in Edineț District, Moldova. It is composed of two villages, Cuconeștii Noi and Cuconeștii Vechi (depopulated as of 2014).

References

Communes of Edineț District
Populated places on the Prut